Ashish Arora is an Indian structural biologist and a senior scientist at Central Drug Research Institute. He did his postgraduate studies at Rajasthan University and post-doctoral work at the Max Planck Institute for Biophysical Chemistry, Goettingen, and University of Virginia, Charlottesville, VA, before joining the Central Drug Research Institute in 2002. He is known for his studies on Protein NMR Spectroscopy and the pathogenesis of diseases such as tuberculosis and visceral leishmaniasis, commonly known as Kala Azar and has delivered invited speeches at various seminars. The Department of Biotechnology of the Government of India awarded him the National Bioscience Award for Career Development, one of the highest Indian science awards, for his contributions to biosciences, in 2011. He is also a recipient of the 2010 Prof. B. K. Bachhawat Memorial Young Scientist Award of the National Academy of Sciences, India.

Selected bibliography

References 

N-BIOS Prize recipients
Indian scientific authors
Living people
Indian medical researchers
Scientists from Lucknow
Year of birth missing (living people)
University of Louisville alumni
Indian biochemists
Structural biology